The 2019 Eastern Illinois Panthers football team represented Eastern Illinois University as a member of the Ohio Valley Conference (OVC) during the 2019 NCAA Division I FCS football season. Led by first-year head coach Adam Cushing, the Panthers compiled an overall record of 1–11 overall with a mark of 1–7 in conference play, placing last out of nine teams in the OVC. Eastern Illinois played home games at O'Brien Field in Charleston, Illinois.

Previous season

The Panthers finished the 2018 season 3–8, 3–5 in OVC play to finish in a tie for sixth place.

Preseason

Preseason coaches' poll
The OVC released their preseason coaches' poll on July 22, 2019. The Panthers were picked to finish in eighth place.

Preseason All-OVC team
The Panthers had one player selected to the preseason all-OVC team.

Defense

Terrell Greer – DL

Schedule

Game summaries

at Chattanooga

at Indiana

Illinois State

at Indiana State

Tennessee Tech

at Murray State

Jacksonville State

at UT Martin

Eastern Kentucky

at Tennessee State

Southeast Missouri State

at Austin Peay

References

Eastern Illinois
Eastern Illinois Panthers football seasons
Eastern Illinois Panthers football